The Japan or All-Japan Figure Skating Championships are a figure skating national championship held annually to determine the national champions of Japan. Skaters compete in the disciplines of men's singles, ladies' singles, pair skating, and ice dancing, although not every discipline has been held every year due to a lack of competitors. Skaters compete at the senior level; Junior level skaters compete at the Japan Junior Figure Skating Championships.

Medalists

Men

Ladies

Pairs

Ice dancing

See also
 Japan Junior Figure Skating Championships

References

External links
 Japan Skating Federation official results & data

 
Figure skating national championships
National championships in Japan